Over and Over may refer to:

Albums 
 Over and Over (The 88 album), 2005
 Over and Over (Erin Bode album), or the title song, 2006
 Over and Over (Boom Boom Satellites album), 2010
 Over and Over (EP), a 2019 EP by Kim Ji-yeon
 Over and Over, by Nana Mouskouri, 1969

Songs 
 "Over and Over" (Bobby Day song), 1958, made famous by The Dave Clark Five in 1965
 "Over and Over" (Every Little Thing song), 1999
 "Over and Over" (Hot Chip song), 2006
 "Over and Over" (Madeline Merlo song), 2017
 "Over and Over" (Madonna song), 1985
 "Over and Over" (Nelly song), featuring Tim McGraw, 2004
 "Over and Over" (Puff Johnson song), 1996
 "Over and Over" (Timmy T song), 1991
 "Over & Over", by Captain Hollywood Project, 1996
 "Over and Over", by Beach House from Once Twice Melody
 "Over and Over", by Black Sabbath from Mob Rules
 "Over and Over", by Boomtown Rats from In the Long Grass
 "Over and Over", by Fleetwood Mac from Tusk
 "Over and Over", by the Goo Goo Dolls from Boxes, 2016
 "Over and Over", by Joe Walsh from But Seriously, Folks...
 "Over and Over", by Joey Albert
 "Over and Over", by MC5 from High Time
 "Over and Over", by Mike Love from Looking Back with Love
 "Over and Over", by Moloko from Statues
 "Over and Over", by Morcheeba from Big Calm
 "Over and Over", by Neck Deep from Rain in July
 "Over and Over", by Neil Young and Crazy Horse from Ragged Glory
 "Over and Over", by Pajama Party from Up All Night
 "Over and Over", by Ryan Adams from 1984
 "Over and Over", by Shalamar from The Look
 "Over and Over", by Sylvester from Sylvester
 "Over and Over", by Three Days Grace from One-X

Other 
 All About Us (musical) (original title: Over and Over), a 1999 musical

See also
Over and Over Again (disambiguation)
 "Over and Over and Over", a song by Jack White from Boarding House Reach
 "Over + Over + Over + Over", a song by Cardiacs from Toy World